Jerry McCullough (born November 26, 1973) is an American former professional basketball player. He spent most of his professional career playing in Europe.

College career
McCullough played college basketball at Pittsburgh, from 1991 to 1996.

Professional career
McCullough was the top-tier level French League's Best Scorer, in 1998. McCullough also got French League Foreign MVP in the same year.

External links
 Euroleague profile
 Lega Basket Serie A profile 
 TBLStat.net profile

1973 births
Living people
African-American basketball players
American expatriate basketball people in Croatia
American expatriate basketball people in France
American expatriate basketball people in Italy
American expatriate basketball people in Russia
American expatriate basketball people in Turkey
American men's basketball players
Basketball players from New York City
BC Dynamo Saint Petersburg players
BC UNICS players
BCM Gravelines players
Élan Béarnais players
KK Cibona players
Olimpia Milano players
Pallacanestro Cantù players
Pallacanestro Varese players
Pistoia Basket 2000 players
Pittsburgh Panthers men's basketball players
Point guards
Quad City Thunder players
Sioux Falls Skyforce (CBA) players
Türk Telekom B.K. players
21st-century African-American sportspeople
20th-century African-American sportspeople